Austrovenus stutchburyi, common name the New Zealand cockle or New Zealand little neck clam, is an edible saltwater clam, a marine bivalve mollusc in the family Veneridae, the Venus clams.

Habitat
Cockles live in harbours and estuaries in New Zealand. They live in the subtidal to intertidal zone, and when they are in the intertidal zone they live between the low tide mark and the mid tide mark. Cockles are unable to survive above the mid tide mark because of the increased exposure time. Cockles prefer to live in soft mud and fine sand, however they can be suffocated by extremely fine sand. For this reason, they mainly live in areas with a large grain size. The cockles bury 2 to 3 cm under the sand.

Body
Cockles have a soft body which is protected from predation, desiccation and wave movement by a sturdy shell.

Predators find it difficult to pierce the shell of adult cockles. Sea birds drop cockles from high up, smashing their shells, to eat the body, but fish (such as flounder) can't break the shells. Younger cockles are more vulnerable to predation because their shells aren't as hard as adult cockles.

If a cockle lives in the intertidal zone it is protected against desiccation by the shell closing tightly together (the adductor muscles do this). A small amount of water is stored inside the shell, keeping the cockles body moist.

Strong wave action can dislodge cockles. The shell prevents damage to the body when it is drifting around in the water.

See also

Venerupis philippinarum

References

 Powell A. W. B., New Zealand Mollusca, William Collins Publishers Ltd, Auckland, New Zealand 1979 
 Glen Pownall, New Zealand Shells and Shellfish, Seven Seas Publishing Pty Ltd, Wellington, New Zealand 1979 
 

Veneridae
Bivalves of New Zealand
Bivalves described in 1828
New Zealand seafood